Jodie Elizabeth Harrison (born 1968) is an Australian politician who has represented the Charlestown Electorate in the New South Wales Legislative Assembly for the Labor Party since 25 October 2014, when she was elected in a by-election.

Personal life
Harrison was born in 1968 and is the eldest child of Clive Harrison and Elizabeth Denning. In 1973 her brother Todd Harrison was born.  Harrison spent her formative years growing up in south-western suburbs of Sydney.

Harrison moved to the Lake Macquarie region in the early 1990s after Harrison's parents bought a small business in Lake Macquarie.

Early career
Harrison worked at Newcastle City Council from 1993 until 2007 in various roles encompassing organisational change management, organisational performance and governance.  Harrison was the inaugural chairperson of Newcastle City Council's Women's Committee established in the mid 1990s.

Harrison was employed as a Recruitment Officer by the United Services Union (USU) from 2007-2011 and during that time was also the USU's Women's Committee Coordinator. As part of this job Harrison was sent to the United States as part of Australian Council of Trade Unions (ACTU) contingent to work with one of the major unions, the Service Employees International Union (SEIU).

In 2011-12 Harrison worked for United Voice (previously known as the Liquor Hospitality and Miscellaneous Workers Union) organising early childhood educators and people in the care sector. Harrison worked to gain better working conditions and professional wages for low-paid workers.

Political career
Harrison was elected as a Councillor to North WardLake Macquarie City Council in 2008

In 2012 Harrison was popularly elected to Mayor of the City of Lake Macquarie and became the first female to be elected to the position. Harrison served as Mayor until the Lake Macquarie election in September 2016, which she did not recontest.

Harrison has represented the Electoral district of Charlestown in the New South Wales Legislative Assembly for the Labor Party since 25 October 2014 when she was elected in a by-election after the resignation of Andrew Cornwell.

In April 2015, Harrison was appointed as; Shadow Minister for the Hunter, Women, Prevention of Domestic Violence & Sexual Assault and Early Childhood Education.

In January 2016, Harrison resigned from the Shadow Cabinet citing family reasons.

Following the 2019 NSW election, Harrison was returned to the Opposition front bench as Shadow Minister for Early Childhood Education. In a 2021 reshuffle, Harrison was appointed Shadow Minister for the Prevention of Domestic Violence and Sexual Assault, Shadow Minister for Seniors and Shadow Minister for Women.

Since 2015, Harrison has been a member of the Parliament of New South Wales Committee on Children and Young People.

References

External links

1968 births
Living people
Members of the New South Wales Legislative Assembly
Labor Left politicians
Mayors of places in New South Wales
New South Wales local councillors
Place of birth missing (living people)
Australian Labor Party members of the Parliament of New South Wales
Australian Labor Party mayors
21st-century Australian politicians
Women members of the New South Wales Legislative Assembly
Women mayors of places in New South Wales
Women local councillors in Australia
21st-century Australian women politicians